Likinlulem is a major archaeological site on the island of Kosrae in the Federated States of Micronesia. It includes at least nine large enclosures with extensive internal features, a channelized stream, canoe landing, and a large open platform that is subject to inundation at high tide. Occupancy of the site has been dated to 1200-1800 CE, with one area possibly dating as far back as 1000 CE. The site is an important element of the island's oral history as it was here that its paramount chiefs are said to have held court prior to the ascendancy of Leluh c. 1400. When the site was listed on the United States National Register of Historic Places in 2004, it had been surveyed but not extensively excavated.

References

Archaeological sites in the Federated States of Micronesia
Ruins in the Federated States of Micronesia
History of Micronesia
National Register of Historic Places in the Federated States of Micronesia
Kosrae